The Samsung Digimax A7 (codename Kenox D7) is a digital camera which was produced by Samsung Techwin as a successor to the Samsung Digimax A6. It featured a 7-megapixel CCD, 15x zoom (3x optical and 5x digital), 4 cm macro, voice recording, and 30 frame/s MJPEG video recording.

External links

 Samsung product page
 Samsung Tech win

Digimax A7